Anaphase-promoting complex subunit 1 is an enzyme that in humans is encoded by the ANAPC1 gene.

ANAPC1 is one of at least ten subunits of the anaphase-promoting complex (APC), which functions at the metaphase-to-anaphase transition of the cell cycle and is regulated by spindle checkpoint proteins. The APC is an E3 ubiquitin ligase that targets cell cycle regulatory proteins for degradation by the proteasome, thereby allowing progression through the cell cycle (supplied by OMIM).

Interactions
ANAPC1 has been shown to interact with ANAPC5, ANAPC4, ANAPC2, CDC27 and ANAPC7.

References

External links

Further reading